West Lyon Community School District is a rural public school district headquartered in Inwood, Iowa. The district is mostly within Lyon County, with a small area in Sioux County, and serves the towns of Inwood, Alvord, Larchwood, and Lester, and the surrounding rural areas.

The district was formed in 1960, and for a few years, the district operated two separate schools: West Lyon North, serving Larchwood and Lester, and West Lyon South, serving Inwood and Alvord. Eventually, this was reduced to just a single school, serving the four towns of Alvord, Inwood, Larchwood, and Lester.

Shawn Kreman has served as superintendent since 2018, after serving as principal at Iowa Valley.

Schools
The district operates three schools in a single building at 1787 182nd Street, Inwood:
 West Lyon High School
 West Lyon Junior High School
 West Lyon Elementary School

West Lyon High School

Athletics
The Wildcats are members of the Siouxland Conference, and participate in the following sports:
Football
 5-time State Champions (1998, 1999, 2010, 2013, 2019)
Cross Country
Volleyball
Basketball
Boys' 2014 Class 1A State Champions
Wrestling
Golf
Track and Field
 Boys' 2000 Class 2A State Champions
Baseball
Softball

Activities

See also
List of school districts in Iowa
List of high schools in Iowa

References

External links
 West Lyon Community School District

School districts in Iowa
Education in Lyon County, Iowa
Education in Sioux County, Iowa
1960 establishments in Iowa
School districts established in 1960